Jesse Hill Ford (December 28, 1928 – June 1, 1996) was an American writer of Southern literature, best known for his critical and commercial success in short fiction as well as the novels  Mountains of Gilead and The Liberation of Lord Byron Jones.

Biography
He was born in Troy, Alabama on December 28, 1928. Ford was raised in Nashville, Tennessee. He attended Montgomery Bell Academy and received his Bachelor of Arts from Vanderbilt University. His education was interrupted by the Korean War, during which he served in the United States Navy. Following his discharge, he enrolled in the University of Florida, where he received a Master of Arts in 1955. After graduation he worked as a public relations director, but in 1957 he decided to devote himself to writing on a full-time basis. He and his family moved to Humboldt, Tennessee. Two years later, he won an Atlantic Monthly prize for the short story "The Surest Thing in Show Business". In 1961, he spent a year at the University of Oslo as a Fulbright Scholar and published his first novel, Mountains of Gilead, and in 1964 he wrote both the teleplay and theatrical scripts of The Conversion of Buster Drumwright.

One year later, Ford published The Liberation of Lord Byron Jones, which was selected by the Book of the Month Club. A critical and commercial success, it earned him a Guggenheim Fellowship for fiction writing, and was later adapted by Ford and Stirling Silliphant for a 1970 feature film directed by William Wyler. Other works by Ford include Fishes, Birds, and Sons of Men, a compilation of his early short stories; The Feast of Saint Barnabas, which focused on a Florida race riot; and The Raider, a historical novel set in Tennessee before and during the American Civil War.

In 1971, Ford shot a black soldier, Pvt. George Henry Doaks Jr., 19, he believed was a threat to his 17-year-old son when he saw Doaks' car parked on his private driveway. Coincidentally, the man's female companion was a relative of the woman who had served as the basis for The Liberation of Lord Byron Jones. He also contributed guest columns to USA Today in 1989 and 1990 after changing from politically liberal to conservative.

He was initially indicted on a charge of first degree murder by a Gibson County Grand Jury and released on $20,000 bond at the preliminary hearing.

He eventually returned to Nashville where, severely depressed following open-heart surgery and the publication of his collected letters, he committed suicide on June 1, 1996.

External links
 LIFE Magazine article (Oct. 29, 1971)

References

1928 births
1996 suicides
20th-century American novelists
American male novelists
Edgar Award winners
People from Nashville, Tennessee
People from Humboldt, Tennessee
People from Troy, Alabama
Suicides in Tennessee
University of Florida alumni
USA Today people
Vanderbilt University alumni
Novelists from Alabama
Novelists from Tennessee
American male short story writers
Journalists from Alabama
20th-century American short story writers
20th-century American male writers
20th-century American non-fiction writers
American male non-fiction writers
20th-century American journalists
American male journalists
1996 deaths